The Forestiere Underground Gardens in Fresno, California are a series of subterranean structures built by Baldassare Forestiere, an immigrant from Sicily, over a period of 40 years from 1906 to his death in 1946. The gardens are operated by members of the Forestiere family through the Forestiere Historical Center, and can be considered a spectacular and unconventional example of vernacular architecture.

History
Baldassare Forestiere (July 8, 1879 – November 10, 1946) was born in the hamlet of Filari, near Rometta on the northeastern tip of Sicily. He immigrated to the United States in the early 1900s after a conflict with his father, and after time on the East Coast purchased land in Fresno. He found the hardpan soil unsuitable for citrus trees, and the weather punishingly hot during the summer.

Baldassare dug a small cellar to escape the summer heat. He was likely influenced by Roman catacombs and wine cellars he had seen in Italy. Finding it effective and comfortable, he carved a series of attached rooms and took up residence there. Baldassare then began experimenting with growing trees in underground chambers with skylights, and found that with care they would grow well, and being below ground protected them from frost. Baldassare continued expanding and improving these underground gardens until his death in 1946, using handtools and a pair of mules.

The gardens were listed on the National Register of Historic Places in 1977 and registered as No. 916 on the list of California Historical Landmarks in 1978.

Description
There are 65 rooms in the Forestiere Underground Gardens. It has a summer bedroom, a winter bedroom, a bath, a functional kitchen, a fish pond, and a parlor with a fireplace. Interspersed amongst the beautiful stone walls and archways are grottoes and courtyards that allow for pockets of light.

The gardens have skylights and catchbasins for water. The dirt that was moved to create the large structure was utilized elsewhere to fill planters, create stones placed within the catacombs, and to level out other parts of the land.  The pathways and rooms were constructed with various widths to help direct airflow by creating pressure as it moves through narrower portions and maintain movement as it bounces off the slants and curves of the cavernous walls.  The conical skylights allow for the hot air to be pushed out more quickly and the cool air to remain below.

The plants and trees, some of which are over 100 years old, are protected from the frost in the winter months by virtue of construction.  Each level was planted at different times, so they bloom in succession, in order to lengthen the growing season.  It houses a variety of fruit ranging from citrus and berries to exotic fruits like the kumquat, loquat, and jujube.  The trees have been grafted to bear more than one kind of fruit, allowing for a larger variety to be grown throughout the space.  Trees and vines were also planted above the dwelling, acting as insulation and forming canopies that provide protection from the elements.

Depictions

T. Coraghessan Boyle wrote a fictionalized account of Forestiere, the short story "The Underground Gardens," which was published in The New Yorker in 1998.

See also
 Burro Schmidt Tunnel is a  mining tunnel dug with hand tools and dynamite over a 38-year period
Ferdinand Cheval, a French postman who constructed an "ideal palace" out of rocks in his spare time.
 Hermit House, a residence located in Herzliya, Israel with mosaics constructed by one man over thirty years.
House on the Rock Alex Jordan, Jr. constructed "Japanese House" atop rock pinnacle in Spring Green, Wisconsin.
Nitt Witt Ridge a house in Cambria, California constructed in a similar style.
 Watts Towers in Los Angeles, a collection of 17 interconnected structures, built by Italian immigrant Sabato Rodia.
 Hobby tunneling

References

External links 

 Official Website - Forestiere Underground Gardens 
 Forestiere Historical Center and Underground Gardens
 Baldasare's Magnum Opus
 
 Baldasare Forestiere's Underground Gardens

Buildings and structures in Fresno, California
Historic house museums in California
Museums in Fresno County, California
Houses in Fresno County, California
History of the San Joaquin Valley
Subterranea of the United States
Houses on the National Register of Historic Places in California
National Register of Historic Places in Fresno County, California
Parks in the San Joaquin Valley
Roadside attractions in California
Underground cities
Tourist attractions in Fresno, California
Vernacular architecture in California
Visionary environments